Jennifer Rockwood (born September 20, 1966) is an American soccer coach, and the head coach for the BYU Cougars women's soccer team, a position she has held since 1989. She is the only coach the school recognizes since the club joined NCAA competition in 1995.

Early life
Rockwood was born to Jerry and Kae Rockwood as the oldest of five children, with her brothers being named Jon, Jason, Jared, and Jeffrey. Throughout junior high and high school Rockwood acted as a four-sport athlete, in soccer, basketball, softball, and track. Rockwood was offered a basketball scholarship at Ricks College, which she accepted in the fall of 1984, but her one true desire was soccer. After participating in basketball in the Fall-winter of 1984–85, Rockwood transferred and enrolled at Brigham Young University. Rockwood would play with the Cougars club team from 1985 to 1988, and as a senior Rockwood was placed in charge of scheduling and budgets for the club team.

Coaching
Rockwood coached high school soccer for the Waterford School girls' team and the Meridian School's boys' and girls' teams prior to gradating from BYU. After graduating, she became the club team's head coach in 1989 and led them to two Western National Collegiate Club soccer Association (NCCSA) Championships in 1993 and 1994. In 1995 BYU officially recognized women's soccer as an NCAA sport. Rockwood was retained and became the Cougars first NCAA women's soccer coach. Rockwood began to have immediate success. In her 27 years as head coach, Rockwood's Cougars have made the NCAA tournament 21 times. In the October 19, 2013 match vs. the San Francisco Dons, Rockwood would amass her 300th win. Twice Rockwood has led the Cougars to the NCAA's Elite 8: 2003 and 2012. In 2021 Rockwood led the Cougars to their first ever College Cup. Athletes playing for Rockwood have seen continual success over those 27 seasons. 46 of Rockwood's players have gone on to win All-American awards.

Head coaching record
Neither the WAC nor the WCC held a conference tournament, so the highest achievement BYU could attain during those regular seasons was the regular season title.

References 

1966 births
Living people
BYU Cougars women's soccer coaches
American Latter Day Saints
American women's soccer coaches
American women's soccer players
Female association football managers
Women's association footballers not categorized by position
High school soccer coaches in the United States